Worth Forest is a  biological Site of Special Scientific Interest  south of Crawley in West Sussex. It is in the High Weald Area of Outstanding Natural Beauty.

This ancient wood is in a ghyll formed by a stream which has eroded soft sandstone. The poorly drained valley bottom has carpets of Sphagnum while the upper slopes are dry and have a diverse community of mosses, liverworts and lichens.

The site is private land but it is crossed by public footpaths.

References

Sites of Special Scientific Interest in West Sussex
Forests and woodlands of West Sussex